Norman Gilliland has been a producer on Wisconsin Public Radio since 1984, where he hosts classical music broadcasts, produces the interview program University of the Air, and reads for Chapter A Day. He holds degrees in English and Broadcasting from the University of Florida and attended graduate school in English at Duke University, where he developed an interest in broadcasting. He is also an active author with four published books, the historical novel Sand Mansions and its stand-alone sequel Midnight Catch, Downeast Ledge (2013), plus two nonfiction books about classical music--Grace Notes for a Year and Scores to Settle. He has produced an audio drama based upon Dick Ringler's modern English translation of the Old English narrative Beowulf titled Beowulf: The Complete Story—A Drama. He was one of a handful of experts interviewed in the Academy Award-winning short documentary A Note of Triumph: The Golden Age of Norman Corwin.

In 1994 he founded NEMO Productions, the mission of which is to produce books and audio that combine entertainment and history.  He also hosted the weekly program "Old Time Radio Drama" from 8-11 Saturday and Sunday nights on Wisconsin Public Radio and is a host-producer for Wisconsin Public Television's "University Place Presents."

External links
Official NEMO Productions website
University of Wisconsin Press about his book
Bio from Wisconsin Public Radio site
Audio book Gilliland produced

Notes and references

University of Florida alumni
Duke University alumni
Classical music radio presenters
Radio personalities from Wisconsin
Living people
1949 births
People from Bethesda, Maryland